Stapp is the surname of the following people
 Andy Stapp (1944–2014), American anti–Vietnam War activist
 Babe Stapp (1904–1980), American racecar driver
 Chris Stapp (born 1973), New Zealand actor
 Emilie Blackmore Stapp (1876–1962), American children's author and philanthropist
 Frank Howard Nelson Stapp (1908–1993), New Zealand railway worker and concert impresario
 Gregory Stapp, American opera singer 
 Henry Stapp (born 1928), American philosopher and physicist
 Jaclyn Stapp (born 1980), American beauty queen, fashion model, and philanthropist; wife of Scott Stapp
 Jack Stapp (1912–1980), American country music manager
 John Franklin Stapp (1937-2014), American minor league baseball player
 John Stapp (1910–1999), American aeronautical medicine expert
 Stapp's ironical paradox 
 Marjorie Stapp (1921–2014), American actress
 Milton Stapp (1792–1869), American politician
 Philip Stapp (1908-2003), movie director, writer, editor
 René Stapp, French racing driver
 Scott Stapp (born 1973), American singer-songwriter